Owen MacCarthy (fl. 1692) was an Irish Jacobite politician and soldier. 

MacCarthy was a Member of Parliament for Clonakilty in the short-lived Patriot Parliament called by James II of England in 1689. During the Williamite War in Ireland, he raised a regiment of foot and was a colonel serving under the Earl of Tyrconnell. He left Ireland for France with James II in 1690, and in 1692 he was a colonel in the Irish Brigade of the French Royal Army.

References

Year of birth unknown
Year of death unknown
17th-century Irish people
Irish Jacobites
Irish MPs 1689
Irish soldiers in the army of James II of England
Irish soldiers in the French Army
Owen
Members of the Parliament of Ireland (pre-1801) for County Cork constituencies